The Miami Midnites are a professional minor league basketball team based in Miami, Florida. Established in 2014, the club was an affiliate of the Maccabi Haifa B.C. of the Israeli Basketball Premier League, The team is owned by Jeffrey Rosen, CEO of Triangle Entertainment.

History
Competing in the Florida Basketball Association, the Midnites named Florida Hall of Fame coach Marcos '"Shakey" Rodriguez its first head coach in April 2014. After an 11-1 regular season, Miami defeated Palm Beach Knights (141–121) in the FBA Playoff semifinals before capturing the league championship against Tampa Bay Rebels 98-82 on August 10, 2014.

After the FBA Summer season, Miami Midnites joined the American Basketball Association for the 2014–15 season. Miami were members of the ABA Southeast Division.

In their first season competing in the ABA Miami advanced through the league playoffs before losing in the ABA Championship to Shreveport-Bossier Mavericks.

Season-by-season

Notable players

Yoav Saffar (born 1975), Israeli basketball player

References

External links
Miami Midnites official site
@MiamiMidnites
Maccabi Haifa B.C. official site

Defunct American Basketball Association (2000–present) teams
2014 establishments in Florida
Basketball teams established in 2014
Basketball teams in Miami
Davie, Florida
Maccabi Haifa B.C.